Panasonic Lumix DMC-FX37 is a digital camera by Panasonic, released late in 2008. The highest-resolution pictures it records is 10.1 megapixels, through its 25 mm ultra wide-angle Leica DC lens.  It is Panasonic's first compact digital camera to support 720p video at 30 fps.

Property
10.1-Megapixel
25mm LEICA DC VARIO-ELMARIT Wide-Angle Lens
5x Optical Zoom
2.5 Diagonal Intelligent LCD and HD Output

References

External links
DMC-FX37A on shop.panasonic.com
DMC-FX37K on shop.panasonic.com
DMC-FX37S on shop.panasonic.com
DMC-FX37W on shop.panasonic.com
Panasonic Lumix DMC-FX37 Review

Bridge digital cameras
FX37